Basil van Rooyen (born 19 April 1939 in Johannesburg) is a former racing driver, race car developer, inventor and engineer. His career comprised racing a motorcycle, Anglia, Lotus Cortina, Mustang, Alfa Romeo, Capri Perana Chevy Can-am, Fiat/Ferrari saloon cars, sports cars, single seaters and F1. (Formula 1)

Participation
Puch 250. He started racing motorcycles in 1957 with the 24 hour race at Grand Central track, a narrow race track near Johannesburg. At the time he was 18 year old, having just gotten his license.

Sprint racing
Ford Anglia 105E. Home modifications and some imported parts brought many class wins and overall places in 1961 and 1962 on the newly inaugurated Kyalami Racetrack. Upgraded to a Cortina 1200cc in 1963.

In 1964, Ford Motor Company SA donated two Lotus Cortinas to the most successful SA Ford racers. (1 to BvR and Superformance, a performance shop where he was Managing Director, to race in the new countrywide SA Saloon Car Championship and 1 to Willie Meissner, talented ex-GSM Dart engineer, of Meissner Motors and driver Koos Swanepoel, who raced an Anglia 1500). 
BvR car at first could not keep up and Swanepoel won the 1964 SA Saloon Car Championship.

In 1965, BvR development skills surpassed Meissner, his nemesis, and he was faster and won all or nearly all the races.

SA Saloon Car Championship racing became so popular with race fans that in so 1966 Ford SA donated the new Ford Mustang V8s to the same pair. 
BvR car was consistently faster and he won all the races to become 1966 and 1967 SA Saloon car champion.

1968 Alfa Romeo, had imported an Auto Delta Alfa GTA but it was not fast enough, so they persuaded BvR to develop. (He had been racing Alfa GTVs since 1966 in the Onyx Production Car Series, additional events at the Kyalami venue.) BvR developed a short stroke 2000cc engine which soon lapped faster than his Mustang and started competing very successfully against Meissner’s and Ford SA's new Escorts with 1800cc and 2000cc 4v engines.

Arnold Chatz took over later on, when BvR became involved in Single Seater Racing. He had been persuaded to race the older ex John Love Cooper Climax against world champions in the 1968 South African Grand Prix.
Enjoyed single seaters debut so much that he imported a newer Brabham to enter in the rest of the SA events for the balance of the 1968 year, then a 1968 MacLaren for the 1969 year.  Managed 3 F1 wins by the time he participated in the 1969 SA Grand Prix.
Later in the year had serious accident on the Kyalami straight while tire testing that destroyed the car, and needed time to recuperate.

It seems BvR so impressed the Grand Prix F1 teams with his 1969 Kyalami Grand Prix driving that he was offered a F1 engagement by Ken Tyrrell to immediately join his team as a 2nd driver behind team leader Jackie Stewart.  Due to his injuries from the Kyalami crash this was no longer possible.

In 1970, Continued racing in Onyx Production Car Series and won the Onyx Production Car Championship in an Alfa GTV.

During 1971 Paddy Driver offered BvR his older F5000 single seater to try out, to see if he still had the racer's heart, and BvR finished 3rd and 1st F5000 behind two F1 cars, satisfying himself.

New regulations were introduced in 1971 for the Transvaal Production Car Championship.  The car to beat was the Ford Capri Perana V8 (a special SA vehicle made by Basil Green Motors).  BvR purchased one of these and was soon able to beat the factory car regularly.

This special edition SA car gave BvR an idea!
He made a proposal to General Motors to market a vehicle similar to the Basil Green Ford Capri V8. Developed their Vauxhall Firenza, using a 302 cid Camaro V8 engine and running gear.  100 vehicles would have to be built by GM(SA), which BvR convinced them to do, and were sold locally to make this car, dubbed Chev Can-am, race eligible.

Two race vehicles became awesome racing saloons, set the first saloon 100 mph lap record, won its introductory race, and continued with easy wins as competitors were frightened away. 
These Can-ams are quite popular with Collectors today.

1977 took him to Australia to compete at the well known Sandown 500 and Bathurst 1000 events, in a local GM Holden V8 Torano against the Ford V8s. He made 4th place in the Sandown with a dated model A9X. The SL5000 he was sharing with British Saloon Car Champion Gerry Marshall at Bathurst retired with a broken seat.

In 1979, race organizers introduced a new racing formula, allowing any engine/chassis from one make to be combined. Fiat SA was interested.  This required fabricating a space frame vehicle with fibre-glass panels to look like a Fiat 131, mated with a turbo charged 2.5 litre Ferrari v6 600 bhp power unit. This car quickly proved one of the fastest saloon cars in the type of racing, but shortly after the debut Fiat decided, pressured by sanctions against SA, to pull out of the country.  The car was sold off, but still raced by other drivers.  The formula was shortlived.

Endurance racing
As well as the abovementioned sprint races, Bvr participated in the Annual Kyalami 9 hour endurance races and the Springbok 3 hour series enduros nearly every year, sharing drives with local drivers Arnold Chatz, Eddie Keizan, Dave Charlton, Chappie Wicks, George Santana, Brian Davies, Geoff Mortimer, Colin Burford,  Antonio Prixinho, Peter Gough, and overseas owner/drivers Nanni Galli, Christine Becker, Tony Dean.
Best result was a 2nd place with Tony Dean driving a Ferrari Dino in the 1968 Kyalami 9 hour.

Mazda SA brought their competition Mazda RX100 Saloon from Japan with factory support team to the 1971 Springbok Endurance Series, BvR and Gough as drivers.  Engine performance was impressive, but BvR was so disappointed with the handling that he phoned the SA factory boss for an OK to make alterations.  So, just 2 days before the race, the front suspension was removed, parts and brackets cut, welded, bent etc, then re-assembled - to the horror of the Japanese mechanics! (Thereafter it lapped  - the text says! - up to 4 seconds faster??)

Inventor

 Automatic swimming pool cleaners always skipped certain areas during their cleaning cycle. Invented the Twister, to be added to the suction line, which was patented and so successful that royalties still come in.
 After witnessing serious F1 accidents caused by throttles jamming wide open, invented a special device to be fitted to the brake hydraulics, cutting power to the ignition when a great excess of brake pressure was applied.
 Well ahead of his time, before it even occurred to the top world F1 teams, he invented and fabricated a successful automatically spring activated rear wing drag reduction setup, which was affixed to the high wing of his F1 vehicle, reducing the angle of attack. The high wing configuration was banned by the FIA soon after, due to wing mount breakage accidents.
 Developing the CITS two stroke power unit, presently still being perfected.  One of the most promising new internal combustion ideas, offering reduced fuel consumption, eliminating mixing oil with fuel, meeting global smog emissions regulations,  improved torque and power at all rpms,  better power per unit weight, over other two-stroke and 4 stroke units.

Participation in F1 Grand Prix racing
Van Rooyen participated in two Formula One World Championship Grands Prix, debuting on 1 January 1968.  He retired from both, scoring no championship points.

Personal
BvR, posing in front of his motorsport trophies.

Racing record

Complete Formula One World Championship results
(key)

Complete British Saloon Car Championship results
(key) (Races in bold indicate pole position; races in italics indicate fastest lap.)

† Events with 2 races staged for the different classes.

Complete Bathurst 1000 results

References

Sources
 Photos of BvR and various racing cars
 Profile at www.grandprix.com
 Book publication: Kyalami a reflection on the history pp 396-400 
 Springbok Series by Greg Mills  Book on An Era of Sports and Saloon Car Racing in Southern Africa
 compendium of articles by SA Journalists
 The CITS - Crankcase Independent Two-Stroke Engine

South African racing drivers
South African Formula One drivers
Australian Touring Car Championship drivers
Sportspeople from Johannesburg
1939 births
Living people